William Moon may refer to:

William Moon, inventor of Moon type
William Moon (EastEnders), fictional character on the BBC soap opera EastEnders
Billy Moon, footballer and cricketer
Willy Moon, New Zealand musician